Tribuna is a weekly Russian newspaper that focuses largely on industry and the energy sector.

History 
Tribunas published its first publication in July 1969. Until 1990, the newspaper titled the Sotsialisticheskaya Industriya, then it was renamed into the Rabochaya Tribuna. In 1989 the newspaper was closed by the CPSU Central Committee; one year later it was reorganized as Rabochaya Tribuna.

Since April 1998 for newspaper fixed the current title. Since the 2000s (decade) it is owned by media holding Gazprom Media. Oleg Kuzin has been serving as chief-editor since 2004.

Awards and recognitions 
In 2009, on its 40th anniversary, the newspaper was awarded the national Iskra prize in the  special category For a significant contribution to the development of civil society.

References

External links
 

Gazprom
Newspapers published in the Soviet Union
Russian-language newspapers published in Russia
Publications established in 1969